Jangdan may refer to:

Korean Traditional Rhythm in folk music
Jangdan County, a former county in Gyeonggi Province, Korea, split during the division of Korea
Jangdan-myeon, Paju, Gyeonggi, South Korea